The Man of Ten Thousand is a 1796 comedy play by the British writer Thomas Holcroft.

The original Drury Lane cast featured William Barrymore as Sir Pertinax Pitiful, John Palmer as Lord Laroon, Charles Kemble as Dorington, John Bannister as Hairbrain, James William Dodd as Curfew, Richard Suett as Consol, Robert Palmer as Major Rampart, Ralph Wewitzer as Herbert, James Aickin as Hudson, John Phillimore as Clerk, Jane Pope as Lady Taunton and Elizabeth Farren as Olivia.

Referdatinences

Bibliography
 Nicoll, Allardyce. A History of English Drama 1660–1900: Volume III. Cambridge University Press, 2009.
 Hogan, C.B (ed.) The London Stage, 1660–1800: Volume V. Southern Illinois University Press, 1968.

1796 plays
Comedy plays
West End plays
Plays by Thomas Holcroft